Koldín is a municipality and village in Ústí nad Orlicí District in the Pardubice Region of the Czech Republic. It has about 400 inhabitants.

Administrative parts
The village of Hradiště is an administrative part of Koldín.

References

Villages in Ústí nad Orlicí District